|}

The St James's Palace Stakes is a Group 1 flat horse race in Great Britain open to three-year-old colts. It is run at Ascot over a distance of 7 furlongs and 213 yards (1,603 metres). It is scheduled to be run each year in June.

History
The event is named after St James's Palace, a royal residence during the Tudor period. It was established in 1834, and the inaugural race was a walkover.

The present system of race grading was introduced in 1971, and, for a period, the St James's Palace Stakes was classed at Group 2 level. It was promoted to Group 1 status in 1988.

The St James's Palace Stakes usually features horses which ran previously in the 2,000 Guineas, the Poule d'Essai des Poulains or the Irish 2,000 Guineas. It is contested on the opening day of the Royal Ascot meeting.

Records
Leading jockey (6 wins):
 Michael Kinane – Dara Monarch (1982), Brief Truce (1992), Grand Lodge (1994), Giant's Causeway (2000), Rock of Gibraltar (2002), Azamour (2004)

Leading trainer (8 wins):
 Aidan O'Brien – Giant's Causeway (2000), Black Minnaloushe (2001), Rock of Gibraltar (2002), Excellent Art (2007), Henrythenavigator (2008), Mastercraftsman (2009), Gleneagles (2015), Circus Maximus (2019)

Leading owner (8 wins): (includes part ownership)
 Sue Magnier – Giant's Causeway (2000), Black Minnaloushe (2001), Rock of Gibraltar (2002), Excellent Art (2007), Henrythenavigator (2008), Mastercraftsman (2009), Gleneagles (2015), Circus Maximus (2019)

Winners since 1900

Earlier winners

 1834: Plenipotentiary
 1835: Ascot
 1836–37: no race
 1838: Boeotian
 1839: Euclid
 1840: Scutari
 1841: Satirist
 1842: Misdeal
 1843: Ameer
 1844: Ionian
 1845: Idas
 1846: The Free Lance
 1847: Montpensier
 1848: Glendower
 1849: Uriel
 1850: Nutcracker
 1851: The Ban
 1852: Daniel O'Rourke
 1853: The Reiver
 1854: Baalbec
 1855: Paletot
 1856: Pitapat
 1857: Anton
 1858: Fitz-Roland
 1859: Cynricus
 1860: Tom Bowline
 1861: Walloon
 1862: Carisbrook
 1863: Gladstone
 1864: The Beadle
 1865: Lasaretto
 1866: Staghound
 1867: Hermit
 1868: The Earl
 1869: Dunbar
 1870: King Cole
 1871: Dalnacardoch
 1872: Queen's Messenger
 1873: Gang Forward
 1874: Leolinus
 1875: Bay of Naples
 1876: Great Tom
 1877: Covenanter
 1878: Bonnie Scotland
 1879: Rayon d'Or
 1880: Bend Or
 1881: Iroquois
 1882: Battlefield
 1883: Galliard
 1884: Cambusmore
 1885: Sheraton
 1886: Ormonde
 1887: Florentine
 1888: Ossory / Galore 1
 1889: Pioneer
 1890: Janissary
 1891: Common
 1892: St Angelo
 1893: Phocion
 1894: Florizel II
 1895: Troon
 1896: His Reverence
 1897: Vesuvian
 1898: Cap Martin
 1899: Millennium

1 The 1888 race was a dead-heat and has joint winners.2 The 1941 running was held at Newmarket.

See also
 Horse racing in Great Britain
 List of British flat horse races

References

 Paris-Turf:
 Racing Post:

 galopp-sieger.de – St. James's Palace Stakes.
 ifhaonline.org – International Federation of Horseracing Authorities – St. James's Palace Stakes (2019).
 pedigreequery.com – St. James's Palace Stakes – Ascot.
 
 Race Recordings 

Flat races in Great Britain
Ascot Racecourse
Flat horse races for three-year-olds
Recurring sporting events established in 1834
British Champions Series
1834 establishments in England